Dadri Assembly constituency is one of the 403 constituencies of the Uttar Pradesh Legislative Assembly, India. It is a part of the Gautam Budh Nagar district and one of the five assembly constituencies in the Gautam Buddh Nagar Lok Sabha constituency. It includes some parts of Greater Noida. First election in this assembly constituency was held in 1957 after the "DPACO (1956)" (delimitation order) was passed in 1956. After the "Delimitation of Parliamentary and Assembly Constituencies Order, 2008" was passed in 2008, the constituency was assigned identification number 62. The 2022 Assembly Elections in the Constituency are scheduled for 10 February 2022.

Area/wards
The Dadri Assembly constituency comprises Dadri; Kacheda Warsabad, Bisrakh Jalalpur, Patwari, Chipiyana Bujurg, Chhapraula, Roza Yakubpur, Haibatpur, Khodana Kalan, Saini, Khedi, Khairpur Gujar, Achheja of Bisrakh block and Dadri MB of Dadri Tehsil; Surajpur (Greater Noida).

Members of the Legislative Assembly

Election results

2022

2017

2012

See also
Gautam Buddha Nagar Lok Sabha constituency
Gautam Budh Nagar district
Sixteenth Legislative Assembly of Uttar Pradesh
Uttar Pradesh Legislative Assembly

References

External links
 

Assembly constituencies of Uttar Pradesh
Dadri
Constituencies established in 1956
1956 establishments in Uttar Pradesh